Donald G. MacKinnon (born 3 February 1949) is a former Canadian politician, who represented the electoral district of Winsloe-West Royalty in the Legislative Assembly of Prince Edward Island from 1996 to 2003. He was a member of the Prince Edward Island Progressive Conservative Party.

In July 1998, MacKinnon was appointed to the Executive Council of Prince Edward Island as Minister of Development. In May 2000, he was moved to Minister of Transportation and Public Works. He was shuffled out of cabinet in August 2002.

References

Living people
Members of the Executive Council of Prince Edward Island
Progressive Conservative Party of Prince Edward Island MLAs
21st-century Canadian politicians
1949 births